The Xerox Development Environment was one of the first Integrated development environments (IDEs). It was first implemented on the Xerox Alto in 1977.

See also
 BCPL
 Mesa (programming language)

External links
 The Xerox Development Environment (XDE)
 Paper on XDE

Integrated development environments
Development Environment